Victoria (V.M.) Whitworth  (née Thompson; born in London 1966) is a British writer, archaeologist and art historian. Her published writings, which focus on Britain in the later first millennium AD, include novels, academic works and a memoir.

Biography
Whitworth studied English (specialising in Medieval languages, literature and archaeology) at St Anne's College, Oxford, before doing an MA and a D.Phil. in York. From 2012 to 2016 she was a lecturer at the Centre for Nordic Studies on the Orkney campus of the University of the Highlands and Islands. Her research has primarily focused on Pictish, Scottish and Anglo-Saxon stone sculpture. Whitworth has published three historical novels set in Viking Age England. On 27 September 2020 a letter in support of JK Rowling for her stance on transgender issues was published in the Sunday Times to which Whitworth was one of 58 signatories.

Books

Fiction
 The Bone Thief (Ebury Press, 2012), 
 The Traitors’ Pit (Ebury Press, 2013), 
 Daughter of the Wolf (Head of Zeus, 2016),

Memoir
 Swimming with Seals (Head of Zeus, 2016),

Academic books
 Dying and Death in Later Anglo-Saxon England (Boydell & Brewer, 2004), 
 Bodystones and Guardian Beasts: The Gravestones of Middle Britain from the 8th to 11th Centuries (Oxford University Press, forthcoming)

References

External links
 Author's web site
 Victoria Whitworth on Academia.edu

1966 births
British archaeologists
British women archaeologists
Alumni of the University of York
Academics of the University of the Highlands and Islands
Fellows of the Society of Antiquaries of Scotland
Fellows of the Society of Antiquaries of London
Anglo-Saxon studies scholars
Scottish novelists
Living people
British women historians